Nikolay Domakinov (born 11 July 1980) is a Bulgarian footballer who played as a defender.

International career
Domakinov played in two matches on the Bulgaria national football team in 2005 - with Ecuador and Mexico. At the time he participated in the tour of the Bulgaria national football team in North America.

References

External links
 

1980 births
Living people
Bulgarian footballers
Bulgaria international footballers
First Professional Football League (Bulgaria) players
Association football defenders
PFC Cherno More Varna players
Botev Plovdiv players
FC Montana players
FC Sozopol players